Endola is an electoral constituency in the Ohangwena Region of Namibia, on the border of Angola. It had 36,659 inhabitants in 2004 and 14,100 registered voters . The district centre is the settlement of Endola. Ferdinand Ingashipola Shifidi became a councillor of the constituency in November 2014 and was re-elected in 2015 and in 2020.

The constituency is hard-hit by the drought just like the rest of the northern region, but the situation was made worse by lack of drinking water for people and their animals as many water points were disconnected because of unpaid bills. The constituency is also faced with the issue of people who have no national documents. Endola is a flood-prone area with many water pans therefore, good roads are needed to avoid a situation where villages are totally cut off during the rainy season. On the crime front, the constituency is badly affected as it has only one police station at Ongha.

Politics
As is common in all constituencies of former Owamboland, Namibia's ruling SWAPO Party has dominated elections since independence. Ruth Nhinda (SWAPO) was regional councillor for the Endola constituency from 2004. Her death in 2014 necessitated a by-election which was won by Ferdinand Shifidi, also SWAPO. Shifidi was reelected in the 2015 regional election, gathering 5,703 votes, while the only opposition candidate, Hafeni Pius of the Rally for Democracy and Progress (RDP), received 398 votes. Shifidi was again reelected in the 2020 regional election; he received 4,892 votes. Runner-up became Tulipohamba Nghiueuelekwa the Independent Patriots for Change (IPC), an opposition party formed in August 2020, who obtained 1,121 votes.

References 

Constituencies of Ohangwena Region
States and territories established in 1992
1992 establishments in Namibia